The April 2021 nor'easter, also referred to as the 2021 Spring nor'easter, was a significant late-season nor'easter that impacted much of New England with heavy snowfall, gusty winds, thundersnow, and near-whiteout conditions from April 15–17, 2021. The system originated from a weak frontal system late on April 14 over North Carolina, which moved into the ocean the next day and began to strengthen. The low-pressure steadily deepened as it moved up the East Coast, and developed an eye-like feature just prior to peak intensity. It prompted a fairly large area of Winter Storm Warnings across interior sections of New England, with Winter Weather Advisories being issued closer to the coast. Over 20,000 customers lost power at the height of the storm on April 16 due to heavy wet snow, and near-whiteout conditions were reported in many areas. Several injuries, some serious, occurred as well, mostly due to traffic incidents on poorly-treated roadways during the storm. Damage estimates from the system are currently not calculated.

Meteorological history

The nor'easter formed as a weak frontal system at 18:00 UTC on April 14 over western North Carolina, along an already existing series of fronts stretching down the U.S. East Coast. Several media outlets referred to the nor'easter as the "Spring nor'easter" due to its unusual occurrence in mid-spring. It had transitioned into an extratropical cyclone by 12:00 UTC on April 15, as it moved offshore into the Atlantic Ocean and slowly began to strengthen. The low-pressure then steadily strengthened as it moved northeastward up the coast, with its minimum central pressure dropping below  at 00:00 UTC on April 16. The system then turned northwards towards the southeastern Massachusetts coastline, while beginning to strengthen faster. Strong mesoscale banding developed in central and eastern Massachusetts, resulting in much higher snowfall totals than initially forecasted in those areas.

While maintaining peak intensity, the nor'easter made a third landfall near Kingston, Massachusetts at 21:00 UTC, before making a fourth and final landfall near Barnstable, Massachusetts at 00:00 UTC on April 17. After this point, the nor'easter began to steadily weaken while moving northeast toward Nova Scotia, and later passing to the south of it. After coming ashore, the nor'easter began to rapidly weaken, dissipating over eastern Newfoundland later that day.

Preparations and impact

Early on April 14, Winter Storm Watches were issued in the higher elevations of interior New England, and expanded to include more areas later that day. The next day, many Winter Storm Watches were upgraded to Winter Storm Warnings, mainly in the higher elevations, while Winter Weather Advisories were issued in lower elevation areas closer to the coast.

Northeastern United States

Mid-Atlantic states
Much of the Mid-Atlantic saw heavy, soaking rain from the nor'easter, in areas where temperatures weren't cold enough to support snow. New York City picked up  of rain, and areas further to the north saw even more. The region also saw strong gusty winds from the storm, resulting in windswept rain in many areas. Some areas along the southern Long Island shore also reported minor coastal flooding due to the system. The Adirondack Mountains of Upstate New York changed over to snow briefly on the back edge of the storm, and up to  accumulated on the highest peaks.

New England

In advance of the storm, Green Mountain Power in Vermont warned customers of possible power outages during the storm and prepared for restoring power if necessary. They also reminded customers to be prepared for power outages, possibly lasting up to a day. The Vermont Agency of Transportation warned of poor road conditions due to heavy wet snow, and closed VT 108 in Stowe prior to the storm to reduce work for snowplow operators. In New Hampshire, dozens of school districts announced school closings or a switch to remote learning for April 16 in advance of the storm.

In Rhode Island, a coating of snow was observed in Providence, with up to  falling in the northwestern part of the state. Snowflakes were even observed as far south as Narragansett Bay for a period of time. In Massachusetts, the Berkshires and Worcester Hills in Massachusetts saw a widespread  of snow from the system, while the lower elevations of Greater Boston saw . The Blue Hill Observatory in Milton picked up  of snow, making it the sixth-largest April snowstorm on record for the city. The Boston area also observed occasional thundersnow on the morning of April 16, during the period of heaviest snow and highest instability. High snowfall rates and snow-covered roads in central and eastern Massachusetts led MassDOT to deploy over 240 additional snowplows at 10 a.m. EDT on April 16. A game between the Boston Red Sox and Chicago White Sox at Fenway Park was postponed due to the snow at the stadium.

In Maine, the Portland International Jetport delayed a number of flights due to heavy snow and extremely gusty winds. Numerous crashes occurred on snow-covered roadways, with Maine State Police responding to three serious crashes. Crashes on roadways were the main source of injuries from the storm.

Snowfall totals

See also

North American blizzard of 2005
April 2007 nor'easter
March 2013 nor'easter
January 2015 North American blizzard
December 5–6, 2020 nor'easter
February 6–8, 2021 nor'easter

References

External links

 2021 Storm Summaries from the Weather Prediction Center

2020–21 North American winter
Nor'easters
2021 meteorology
2021 in Massachusetts
2021 in New Hampshire
2021 in Vermont
2021 in Maine
Extratropical cyclones
April 2021 events in the United States
Natural disasters in the United States
2021 natural disasters in the United States